The surname Loughlin has several origins. In some cases it a form of the surname McLaughlin (derived from the Irish Mac Lochlainn). In other cases, Loughlin is a form of O'Loughlin (derived from the Irish Ó Lachtnáin).

People with the surname
Anne Loughlin (1894–1979), British labour activist
Charles Loughlin (1914–1993), British politician
Clem Loughlin (1892–1977), Canadian professional ice hockey player
Elliott Loughlin (1910–1989), United States Navy Rear Admiral
Gerard Loughlin, English theologian
Irene Loughlin (born 1967), Canadian performance artist
Jessica Loughlin (born 1975), Australian artist
Jimmy Loughlin (born 1905), English footballer
John Loughlin (disambiguation), several people
Larry Loughlin (1941–1999), American baseball pitcher
Lori Loughlin (born 1964), American actress and producer
Luke Loughlin, Irish Gaelic footballer
Martin F. Loughlin (1923–2007), United States District Judge
Matt Loughlin, American sports broadcaster
Paul Loughlin (born 1966), English rugby league player
Wilf Loughlin (1896–1966), Canadian ice hockey player

People with the given name
Loughlin O'Brien

Other things with the name
Bishop Loughlin Memorial High School

References

Anglicised Irish-language surnames
Irish masculine given names
Surnames of Irish origin